Vladimir Aleksandrovich Plotnikov (born 3 April 1986) is a Kazakhstani professional footballer who last played for FC Ordabasy, and the Kazakhstan national football team.

Career

Club
Plotnikov started his club career in FC Taraz in 2006. Prior to joining FC Kairat in January 2015, Plotnikov played for FC Taraz, FC Kairat, FC Alma-Ata, FC Atyrau and FC Zhetysu.
On 24 November 2017, Kairat announced that Plotnikov had extended his contract with the club until the end of 2020.

On 11 February 2020, FC Ordabasy announced the signing of Plotnikov from FC Kairat.

International
On 29 March 2016, Plotnikov debuted for Kazakhstan in a friendly match against Georgia.

Career statistics

Club

International

Statistics accurate as of match played 29 March 2016

References

External links
 

1986 births
Living people
Kazakhstani footballers
Kazakhstan international footballers
Kazakhstan Premier League players
FC Taraz players
FC Atyrau players
FC Zhetysu players
FC Kairat players
Association football goalkeepers